Lahore is a major metropolis in Punjab, Pakistan.

Lahore may also refer to:

Places

 Lahore Subah, an administrative subdivision of the Mughal Empire

Pakistan
 Lahore District, a district in the Eastern area of Pakistan that contains the city of Lahore
 Lahore Division, an administrative division of the Punjab Province of Pakistan
 Lahore Cantonment, a military-administered settlement
 Lahore Fort, a citadel of the city of Lahore
 Nawan Lahore, a small town in Toba Tek Singh District, situated near Gojra Tehsil at Jhang Road
 Lahor, a town in Swabi District, in the Khyber-Pakhtunkhwa province of Pakistan
 Lahor Tehsil, an administrative subdivision (tehsil) in Swabi District, in the Khyber-Pakhtunkhwa province of Pakistan
 Lahor, FATA, a village in the Federally Administered Tribal Areas of Pakistan
 Lahore Metropolitan Area

United States 
 Lahore, Virginia, a small town in Orange County, Virginia in the United States

In arts and entertainment
 Lahore (film), a 2010 Bollywood sports film
 Lahore: A Sentimental Journey, a 1993 memoir book by Pran Nevile
 Lahore (song), a 2017 song  by Guru Randhawa

In government and politics
 3rd (Lahore) Division, an infantry division of the British Indian Army, first organised in 1852
 Lahore Declaration, a bilateral agreement and governance treaty between India and Pakistan
Lahore Front, battle in the Indo-Pakistani War of 1965
 Lahore Resolution, a formal political statement adopted by the All-India Muslim League
 Treaty of Lahore, a peace treaty marking the end of the First Anglo-Sikh War

Other uses
 Lahore (pigeon)

See also
 Lohar, an ethnic group in Northern India, Pakistan, and Nepal
 Lohara (disambiguation)